Hinkson Christian Academy (HCA) is a private Christian coeducational day school located in the South-Western Administrative Okrug, Moscow, Russia, serving students from kindergarten through 12th grade. All classes at HCA are conducted in English except foreign language classes. AP and honors courses are available for juniors and seniors.

School facilities include 22 classrooms, a computer lab, an art room, a music room, a fully equipped science lab, ESL and learning support classrooms, a library, and a gymnasium equipped with a weight room and locker rooms. The average high school class size is 10 students.

History 
In the fall of 1991 New Life Christian School in Moscow, Russia, began as a Christian school designed to meet the educational needs of local Christian expat families. It began with nineteen children and three teachers in a classroom rented from a Russian school. An independent study program was used largely because of the diversity of grade levels (grades 1–9).

Over the years, the school grew, and the 1994–1995 school year saw the first graduating class. That same year, HCA was granted official registration from the Russian government.  On September 5, 1996, HCA officially began the 1996–1997 academic year in an old Russian kindergarten building first seen only eighteen days earlier. As the school year progressed, many upgrades and improvements were made to the facility. HCA continued to mature into its role as an English language international Christian school. During that school year, school leadership standardized the Russian language program; added Honors classes in English, Russian and Calculus; provided career seminars and evaluation for high school students and increased the student body to 170 students.

In 2000, HCA moved into a larger facility and was able to add new programs – ESL, Resource Education, and a limited Korean education program for Korean students. Enrollment grew to a high of over 200 students per year and over 60 full and part-time staff.

In the spring of 2007 HCA completed a two-year process and was accredited by the Association of Christian Schools International and the Middle States Association of Colleges and Schools.

Curriculum 
The high school offers an entirely college preparatory curriculum for students in grades 9 through 12 including AP and honors courses. Students that complete the necessary graduation requirements receive a high school diploma. Core classes meet four or five times per week for 45 minutes. Physical Education, Health, and other elective classes meet twice per week for 45 minutes. Extracurricular activities include Student Council, National Beta Club, choir, theater, chess, and sports. Competitive sports teams include men's and women's volleyball, basketball, soccer, and badminton.

Athletics 
The last ten years saw the completion of a new gymnasium that serves not only HCA but other international schools around Moscow. The Hinkson Huskies host regular basketball, volleyball, and badminton games, and schools from around the city participate in several tournaments throughout the year.

Drama 
The Hinkson Players Theatre is composed of middle and high school students. Past productions have included such standards as The Importance of Being Earnest and Arsenic and Old Lace, as well as inspirational productions such as The Long Road Home and The Praetorium. In addition to developing their acting talents, students are encouraged to assist with make-up, lighting, and sound effects.

Music 
All elementary students in K-6 attend music classes weekly in preparation for performances in the fall and spring. Besides vocal instruction, students learn basic skills on several instruments including percussion, chimes, the recorder, and the ukulele.

HCA's strong musical tradition continues in secondary with the middle school and high school choirs, culminating in the annual Bella Notte, a musical theatre performance written, choreographed, and performed by the high school choir. Community members are served a meal by the junior class during the performance. Other performances throughout the year include secondary programs at the end of the fall and spring semesters.

To provide training and performance opportunities for music students, HCA participates each year in the ACSI (Association of Christian Schools International) Honors Choir and Orchestra. Following preparation throughout the school year, students travel to European cities to join other young musicians from schools across the continent for an intense week of training and performances.

Accreditation 
Hinkson Christian Academy is accredited by the Association of Christian Schools International in Colorado Springs, CO. Additionally, the school is accredited by the Middle States Accreditation of Colleges and Schools in Philadelphia, PA.

References

External links
 Hinkson Christian Academy
 Hinkson Christian Academy 

International schools in Moscow
Christian schools in Russia
Educational institutions established in 1991
1991 establishments in Russia